Harry Ronald Neil Primrose, Lord Dalmeny  (born 20 November 1967), known as Harry Dalmeny, is a British aristocrat and the Chairman of Sotheby's in the United Kingdom. A member of the British aristocracy, he is the heir to ten noble titles, including the earldoms of Rosebery and Midlothian, to the Primrose family estate Dalmeny House, and to the chiefship of Clan Primrose. Dalmeny is a Deputy Lieutenant for the county of Midlothian and is a member of the Royal Company of Archers.

Early life and background

Harry Primrose was born in 1967, and is the son and heir of Neil Primrose, 7th Earl of Rosebery. He is a great-grandson of Prime Minister Archibald Primrose, 5th Earl of Rosebery, and Hannah de Rothschild, the richest woman in Britain. The earls of Rosebery own Dalmeny House and also owned Mentmore Towers until 1977.

He was educated at the Dragon School, Oxford, and Eton College. He then studied art history at Trinity College, Cambridge.

Career
Lord Dalmeny joined Sotheby's in 1990 to work in the Country House sale department. In 2000, he became Director of Sotheby's and from 2003 to 2007 was Chairman of Sotheby's Olympia. He also took on responsibility for the single-owner sales department in 2006 and became Deputy chairman, Sotheby's UK in 2007. He became Chairman of Sotheby's in 2017.

As Sotheby's director of country house sales in the UK, Lord Dalmeny has been behind the rostrum and on top of the gavel for some of the most high-profile auctions in Europe, including the Duke of Devonshire's sale at Chatsworth House and the 2004 record sale at Hopetoun House of Jack Vettriano's painting The Singing Butler for £744,800.

In 2013, Lord Dalmeny rode in the Queen's carriage at Royal Ascot.

In 2014, the Primrose family sold the painting Rome, From Mount Aventine by J. M. W. Turner for £30.3m to fund restoration work on Dalmeny House. The painting, regarded as one of Turner's finest, had been bought by the future Prime Minister Archibald Primrose in 1878.

In 2019, Lord Dalmeny presided over the auction of Claude Monet's 1890 painting Meules for 110.7 million US dollars at Sotheby's New York, a record for an impressionist work.

Personal life
In 1994, Lord Dalmeny married Caroline Daglish, a former Conservative Party researcher working for Robert Jones MP and Lord Strathclyde. She is a Patroness of the Royal Caledonian Ball. They live between London and Scotland, where he has a house and farm in the Moffat Hills. They have five children: two sons named Caspian and Ptolemy, and three daughters; Marina, Delphi, and Celeste, all born 2002–2005. 
The Dalmenys were reported to be divorcing in 2014. As of 2018, he was in a relationship with Norwegian shipping heiress Pontine Paus. In June 2021, Lord Dalmeny announced his engagement to art advisor Harriet Clapham. They married in 2022.

References

1967 births
Living people
People educated at Eton College
Alumni of Trinity College, Cambridge
British people of German-Jewish descent
British auctioneers
British courtesy barons and lords of Parliament
Harry